Alabal can refer to:

 Alabal, Karakoçan
 Alabal, Sur